Pushnino is a rural locality (a village) in Aserkhovskoye Rural Settlement, Sobinsky District, Vladimir Oblast, Russia. The population was 8 as of 2010.

Geography 
The village is located 10 km north-west from Aserkhovo, 7 km east from Sobinka.

References 

Rural localities in Sobinsky District